Mark-Peter Hof (born 2 January 1990) is a Dutch former professional basketball player. Hof usually played at the small forward or power forward position.

Career
In 2008, Hof started playing as a professional player with the back then named Hanzevast Capitals, a team from the Dutch Basketball League in his hometown Groningen. Hof played three seasons in a row with the club. In 2010, he won the national championship with the team that was renamed the GasTerra Flames. In his last season, the 2010-2011 season, he also won the NBB Cup with the team. Hof left Groningen in 2011, when he decided to go play for Aris Leeuwarden in the same league. After playing as an amateur player in the 2012-2013 season for the Groene Uilen in the Promotiedivisie, Hof returned to his former team GasTerra Flames by signing a one-year contract.

References

External links
Profile at Dutch Basketball League website 
Eurobasket.com profile

1990 births
Living people
Power forwards (basketball)
Dutch Basketball League players
Dutch men's basketball players
Donar (basketball club) players
Small forwards
Aris Leeuwarden players
Sportspeople from Groningen (city)